Elections to the United States House of Representatives were held in Pennsylvania on October 14, 1828, for the 21st Congress.  Members of three different parties were elected to the 21st Congress, the first time in US history that a third party won seats.  The new Anti-Masonic Party won a total of 5 seats, 1 of which was in Pennsylvania.

Background
In the previous election, 20 Jacksonians and 5 Anti-Jacksonians had been elected with one vacancy, which was filled in a special election by an Anti-Jacksonian, for a total of 20 Jacksonians and 6 Anti-Jacksonians.

Congressional districts
Pennsylvania was divided into 18 districts, 6 of which were plural districts
The  consisted of southern Philadelphia County
The  consisted of the City of Philadelphia
The  consisted of northern Philadelphia County
The  (3 seats) consisted of Chester, Delaware and Lancaster Counties
The  consisted of Montgomery County
The  consisted of Dauphin and Lebanon Counties
The  (2 seats) consisted of Berks, Lehigh, and Schuylkill Counties
The  (2 seats) consisted of Bucks, Northampton, Pike, and Wayne Counties
The  (3 seats) consisted of Bradford, Columbia, Luzerne, Lycoming, McKeane, Northumberland, Potter, Susquehanna, and Tioga Counties
The  consisted of York County
The  (2 seats) consisted of Adams, Cumberland, Franklin, and Perry Counties
The  consisted of Centre, Clearfield, Huntingdon, Mifflin, and Union Counties
The  consisted of Bedford, Cambria, and Somerset Counties
The  consisted of Fayette and Greene Counties
The  consisted of Washington County
The  (2 seats) consisted of Allegheny, Armstrong, Beaver, and Butler Counties
The  consisted of Indiana, Jefferson, and Westmoreland Counties
The  consisted of Crawford, Erie, Mercer, Venango, and Warren Counties

Note: Several of these counties covered larger areas than today, having since been divided into smaller counties

Election results
20 incumbents (15 Jacksonians and 5 Anti-Jacksonians) ran for re-election, of whom 12 (all Jacksonians) were re-elected.

A total of 8 seats changed parties. One seat changed from Jacksonian control to Anti-Masonic control, one changed from Jacksonian to Anti-Jacksonian, and six changed from Anti-Jacksonian to Jacksonian, for a net change of five seats lost by the Anti-Jacksonians, four gained by the Jacksonians, and one gained by the Anti-Masonics.

Special elections
Two special elections were held in 1829 for the 21st Congress. Wolf's resignation was due to his having been elected Governor of Pennsylvania.

No seat changed parties after these special elections.

References
1828 Wilkes University Election Statistics Project

1828
Pennsylvania
United States House of Representatives